Hélène Rey (born 1970) is a French economist who serves as Professor at London Business School (LBS). Her work focuses on international trade, financial imbalances, financial crises and the international monetary system.

Early life and education
The daughter of a teacher and an engineer, Rey was born in Brioude of South-Central France in 1970, where she lived for the early years of her life, speaking both French and English. 

Rey received her undergraduate degree from ENSAE Paris in 1994 and a Master of Science degree in Engineering Economic Systems from Stanford University the same year. She has Ph.Ds from Ecole des Hautes Etudes en Sciences Sociales and London School of Economics, both in 1998.

Career
After working as a lecturer at LSE 1997–2000 Rey was assistant professor and later professor (2006) at Princeton University where she also worked at Bendheim Center for Finance and  Woodrow Wilson School.

Rey was a member of the Conseil d'analyse économique which advises the French Prime Minister on economic matters from 2010 to 2012, and since 2012 has been a member of the Commission Economique de la Nation which advises the Finance Minister of France. 

Rey is a regular contributor the French magazine Les Échos. 
She became a co-editor of the Annual Review of Economics as of 2019.

In 2013 Rey became the first woman to win the Yrjö Jahnsson Award, sharing the prize with Thomas Piketty. Rey was also awarded the Inaugural Carl Menger Preis in 2014, the 2015 Prix Edouard Bonnefous, the 2017 Maurice Allais Prize and the 2020 Prix Turgot.

Economic research
Rey focuses her research on the determinants and consequences of financial trade and economic imbalances, the theory of financial crisis, and how the international monetary system is organized. Through her research, she has shown that certain countries different gross external asset positions help them predict future financial positions along with their exchange rates.

Rey is credited with ground-breaking research into the structure of international payments and capital flows.  By examining the balance sheets of creditor and debtor nations, she offered new insights into relative returns on cross-border investments.  She explained her approach in an interview with the Financial Times, which wrote, "She also showed why the US is the world's banker. "We called it 'the US's exorbitant privilege'. The US earns more on external assets than it pays on external liabilities. It has an excess return on the order of 2 per cent ... So it issues a lot of government bonds that are happily bought by the rest of the world."

Other activities
 Cercle des économistes, Member
 French Prudential Supervision and Resolution Authority (ACPR), Member of the Board (2010-2014)

Personal life
Rey is married to fellow professor of economics Richard Portes and the couple have a daughter. They live in London.

Awards and recognition
 Alfred P. Sloan Fellowship (2005)
Germán Bernácer Prize (2006)
 Fellow of the British Academy (2011)
 Birgit Grodal Award (2012)
 Fellow of the European Economic Association (2013)
 Fellow of the Econometric Society (2013)
 Yrjö Jahnsson Award, shared with Thomas Piketty (2013)
 Named one of 25 brightest young economists by the International Monetary Fund.

Selected works

Book chapters

Journal articles

Papers

Further reading 
  Interview with Hélène Rey. Pdf.

References

External links 

1970 births
Living people
School for Advanced Studies in the Social Sciences alumni
Stanford University alumni
Academics of the London School of Economics
Princeton University faculty
French economists
French women economists
Economics educators
21st-century French  economists
People from Haute-Loire
Fellows of the British Academy
Fellows of the Econometric Society
Feminist economists
Sloan Fellows
Fellows of the American Academy of Arts and Sciences
Institute for New Economic Thinking
Annual Reviews (publisher) editors